Stephen Vincent Chitren (born June 8, 1967) is a Japanese-born former Major League Baseball pitcher.

Although Chitren was born in Japan in 1967, he did not grow up there.

Chitren played college baseball at Stanford where he set the school records for most saves in a season and in a career. Chitren was also on the mound for the clinching outs of the 1987 and 1988 College World Series. In the 1987 series, he got a six-out save in the championship game.

He was selected by the Oakland Athletics in the sixth round of the 1989 Major League Baseball draft. He was assigned to the Southern Oregon A's of the Northwest League to begin his professional career. He spent the majority of the 1990 season with the Huntsville Stars and led in the Southern League with 27 saves. He was the lone relief pitcher named to the postseason all-league team.

Chitren made his Major League debut on September 5, 1990, at Fenway Park against the Boston Red Sox. He pitched a scoreless inning in relief of Bob Welch and struck out the first batter he faced, Scott Cooper. In the following season, he was a regular in the Oakland bullpen. He appeared in the third-most games of any pitcher on the team behind only Dennis Eckersley and Joe Klink.

Chitren would not return to the Major Leagues after the 1991 season. He spent the entirety of the 1992 and 1993 seasons in the Oakland farm system and the 1994 and 1995 seasons in the Baltimore Orioles system. In 1995, he pitched in one game for the Amarillo Dillas of the independent Texas–Louisiana League. It would be his final game in professional baseball.

References

External links
 Career statistics and player information from Baseball Reference or Baseball Almanac

1967 births
Living people
Amarillo Dillas players
American baseball players
Bowie Baysox players
Huntsville Stars players
Madison Muskies players
Major League Baseball pitchers
Major League Baseball players from Japan
Oakland Athletics players
Rochester Red Wings players
Southern Oregon A's players
Stanford Cardinal baseball players
Tacoma Tigers players
Anchorage Glacier Pilots players